Gordon Tullock (February 13, 1922 – November 3, 2014) was an economist and professor of law and Economics at the George Mason University School of Law. He is best known for his work on public choice theory, the application of economic thinking to political issues. He was one of the founding figures in his field.

Early life and education
A native of Rockford, Illinois and graduate of Rockford Central High School, Tullock attended the University of Chicago and, after a break for military service during World War II, received a J.D. in 1947.  Following a brief period in private practice, he joined the Foreign Service that fall.  After completing training, he was posted to Tianjin, China, later receiving Chinese language instruction at Yale and Cornell and follow-on postings to Hong Kong and Korea.  He resigned from the Foreign Service in 1956. While he originally intended to pursue a career as a foreign trader in the Far East, his work on The Politics of Bureaucracy eventually led him to begin collaboration with James M. Buchanan at the University of Virginia while Tullock worked at the University of South Carolina teaching international studies.

Academic career
Tullock's collaboration with Buchanan produced The Calculus of Consent: Logical Foundations of Constitutional Democracy (1962), which quickly became a seminal work in the new field of public choice. He later joined Buchanan as a faculty colleague at Virginia. Despite Tullock never having taken any economics courses, for four years Buchanan and Tullock ran an economics research program. They founded a new journal for their field (1966), first called Papers in Non-Market Economics and eventually titled Public Choice, where they invited articles applying economic theory to all sorts of non-market phenomena, especially in the realm of government and politics. Despite the success of the book and the journal, disagreements with the UVA administration eventually led Tullock to leave.

In 1967, Tullock identified many of the concepts of what came to be known as rent-seeking in a seminal paper.

Tullock moved to Virginia Polytechnical Institute (VPI, now called Virginia Tech) in 1968 and was joined by Buchanan a year later. There they continued the Public Choice Society and the journal, of which Tullock remained editor until 1990. At VPI, Tullock wrote a number of influential articles and books, including Private Wants, Public Means (1970), The Logic of the Law (1971), The Social Dilemma (1974), and The Vote Motive (1976).

In 1983, Tullock and the Center for Study of Public Choice moved to George Mason University, at the time a relatively unknown school in Fairfax, Virginia. Tullock taught at GMU from 1983–1987 and at the University of Arizona from 1987–1999. He continued to publish widely (more than 150 papers and 23 books in all), including "The Economics of Wealth and Poverty" (1986), Autocracy (1987), Rent Seeking (1993), The Economics of Non-Human Societies (1994) and On Voting: A Public Choice Approach (1998). In 1999 he returned to George Mason as a professor of law and economics, where he retired in 2008.

Rent seeking
Tullock developed a theory referred to as rent-seeking.  Rent seeking, according to public choice theory, is securing profits through the political process rather than the market process of exchange. An example of rent seeking is when a firm, union, or special-interest group lobbies political actors (e.g. politicians or bureaucrats) to influence legislation in a beneficial manner.  This can lead to moral hazard when politicians make policy decisions based on the lobby instead of the efficiency of the policy.

Tullock also formulated and considered the Tullock paradox, namely, the paradox of why rent-seeking is so cheap.

Tullock's spike
The name "Tullock's spike" refers to a thought experiment in which Tullock suggested that if governments were serious about reducing road casualties, they should mandate that a sharp spike be installed in the center of each car's steering wheel, to increase the probability that an accident would be fatal to the driver. Tullock's idea was that the normal process of risk compensation would then lead to safer driving by the affected drivers, thereby actually reducing driving fatalities.

Awards and recognition
In 1994 Tullock was awarded an honorary Ph.D. from the University of Chicago and in 1998 became a distinguished fellow of the American Economic Association. He served as President of the Southern Economic Association, the International Atlantic Economic Society (1998–1999), the Western Economic Association and the Public Choice Society. In 1996 he was elected to the American Political Science Review Hall of Fame. He was sometimes considered a longshot candidate for the Nobel Memorial Prize in Economic Sciences.

Criticism
His book, The Politics of Bureaucracy, has been criticized for overlooking a substantial body of literature. A number of authors have criticized Tullock and the public choice tradition as being too simplistic in its explanation of political behavior.

Death
On November 3, 2014, Tullock died at the age of 92 in Des Moines.

References

Further reading

External links

 Faculty Biography from George Mason University
 Tullock's bio at the Mercatus Center
 
 Profile of Tullock in National Review 
 

1922 births
2014 deaths
People from Rockford, Illinois
Economists from Illinois
University of Chicago alumni
George Mason University School of Law faculty
Public choice theory
Distinguished Fellows of the American Economic Association
20th-century American economists
21st-century American economists
University of South Carolina faculty
Virginia Tech faculty
University of Arizona faculty
American military personnel of World War II
American expatriates in China
American expatriates in South Korea
Member of the Mont Pelerin Society